Calyx or calyce (plural "calyces"), from the Latin calix which itself comes from the Ancient Greek κάλυξ (kálux) meaning "husk" or "pod", may refer to:

Biology 
 Calyx (anatomy), collective name for several cup-like structures in animal anatomy
 Calyx (botany), the collective name for sepals of a flower
 Calyce (beetle), a genus of beetles
 Calyx (sponge), a genus of sea sponges
 Calyx of Held, a large synapse in the auditory brainstem structure
 Eubela calyx, species of sea snail
 Renal calyx, a chamber in the kidney that surrounds the apex of the renal pyramids

Other uses 
 Calyx (fictional moon), a fictional moon in Colony Wars
 Calyx (magazine), a literary journal
 Calyx (musician), UK producer of drum and bass
 Calyce (mythology), several figures in Greek mythology
 CALYX, publisher
 Calyx Institute, a non-profit education and research organization
 "Calyx", a textile design by Lucienne Day
 "Calyx", a song by Hatfield and the North from their album Hatfield and the North (album)
 Calyx, a type of krater in ancient Greek pottery
 Calyx, a glasshouse and exhibition centre in the Royal Botanic Garden, Sydney

See also 
 Calix (disambiguation)